Vivek Agarwal (3 January 1962 – 26 April 1993) was an Indian cricketer. He was a right-handed batsman who played for Haryana. He was born in Meerut.

Agarwal made a single first-class appearance for the side, during the 1982–83 season, against Bengal. From the opening order, he scored 18 runs in the first innings in which he batted, and a duck in the second.

He worked as a flight purser for Indian Airlines and was on board Flight 491 which crashed on 26 April 1993, after take-off from Aurangabad. He was one of 55 people who died in the accident.

References

External links
Vivek Agarwal at Cricket Archive

Indian cricketers
Haryana cricketers
Sportspeople from Meerut
Victims of aviation accidents or incidents in India
1962 births
1993 deaths
Victims of aviation accidents or incidents in 1993